Kildine Chevalier (born 30 June 1980) is a retired French professional tennis player.

Chevalier has a career high WTA singles ranking of 218, achieved on 2 February 2004. Chevalier also has a career high WTA doubles ranking of 172 achieved on 5 July 2004. Chevalier has won 8 ITF singles titles and 22 doubles titles.

Chevalier retired from professional tennis in 2009.

ITF finals

Singles Finals (8–6)

Doubles Finals (22–23)

Junior Grand Slam finals

Girls' Singles: 1 (1 runner-up)

External links
 
 

1980 births
Living people
French female tennis players
Tennis players from Lyon